Li County or Lixian may refer to the following counties of the People's Republic of China :

Lixian, Beijing (礼贤), in Daxing District, Beijing
Li County, Gansu (礼县), county of Longnan City
Li County, Hebei (蠡县), alias Lizhou/ Lichow, county of Baoding City, also seat of the Apostolic prefecture of Lixian
Li County, Hunan (澧县), county of Changde City
Li County, Sichuan (理县), county of Ngawa Tibetan and Qiang Autonomous Prefecture

See also 
 Lizhou (disambiguation), sometimes translated as "Li County"